Radio Caroline is a British radio station founded in 1964 by Ronan O'Rahilly.

It may also refer to:

Radio Caroline (Netherlands), a Dutch station styled after Radio Caroline, and later changed its name to Radio Waddenzee
Radio Caroline (New Zealand), an earlier radio station in Timaru, New Zealand
Radio Caroline International, name adopted of the earlier Radio North Sea International
Radio Caroline Volume 1, the second DJ mix album by Miss Kittin